The Roman Catholic Diocese of Umuarama is a diocese located in the city of Umuarama in the Ecclesiastical province of Maringá in Brazil.

History
 26 May 1973: Established as Diocese of Umuarama from the Diocese of Campo Mourão

Bishops
 Bishops of Umuarama (Roman rite)
José Maria Maimone, S.A.C. (12 June 1973 - 8 May 2002) Resigned
Vicente Costa (9 October 2002 - 30 December 2009) appointed, Bishop of Jundiaí, São Paulo
João Mamede Filho, O.F.M. Conv. (24 November 2010 – present)

Coadjutor bishop
Frederico Heimler, S.D.B. (1998-2002), did not succeed to see; appointed Bishop of Cruz Alta, Rio Grande do Sul

References
 GCatholic.org
 Catholic Hierarchy
  Diocese website (Portuguese) 

Roman Catholic dioceses in Brazil
Christian organizations established in 1973
Umuarama, Roman Catholic Diocese of
Roman Catholic dioceses and prelatures established in the 20th century
Umuarama
1975 establishments in Brazil